The Ceratolasmatidae are a family of harvestmen with eleven described species.

The monophyly of this family is questionable; it is composed of three possibly monophyletic groups:

 Ceratolasma and Acuclavella are four to six millimeters long, with moderately short legs and short pedipalps. These two genera are closely related to Ischyropsalis (Ischyropsalididae).
 Hesperonemastoma species range from one to two millimeters in body length. They have similarities to Nemastoma, which occurs in the Old World (hespero = "west" alludes to the occurrence in the New World). It seems to be more closely related to Taracus (Sabaconidae) than to Ceratolasma.
 Crosbycus has a body length of less than one millimeter. The pedipalps are long and very thin. Its moderately long legs are densely covered with setae, spikes and trichomes. Crosbycus should possibly be placed in its own family.

Distribution
The family is restricted to North America, from California to British Columbia. Crosbycus is also found in Eastern Asia.

Name
The genus name is a combination of Ancient Greek keras "horn" and the ending -lasma, referring to the similarity of genera such as Ortholasma and Dendrolasma (Nemastomatidae).

Species
 Acuclavella Shear, 1986
 Acuclavella cosmetoides Shear, 1986 -- Idaho
 Acuclavella merickeli Shear, 1986 -- Idaho
 Acuclavella quattuor Shear, 1986 -- Idaho
 Acuclavella shoshone Shear, 1986 -- Idaho
 Ceratolasma Goodnight & Goodnight, 1942
 Ceratolasma tricantha Goodnight & Goodnight, 1942 -- Oregon
 Crosbycus Roewer, 1914
 Crosbycus dasycnemus (Crosby, 1911) -- British Columbia and China
 Hesperonemastoma Gruber, 1970
 Hesperonemastoma pallidimaculosum (Goodnight & Goodnight, 1945) -- Alabama
 Hesperonemastoma inops (Packard, 1884) -- cave in Kentucky
 Hesperonemastoma modestum (Banks, 1894) -- western United States
 Hesperonemastoma packardi (Roewer, 1914) -- cave in Utah
 Hesperonemastoma kepharti (Crosby & Bishop, 1924) -- North Carolina

Footnotes

References
 Joel Hallan's Biology Catalog: Ceratolasmatidae
  (eds.) (2007): Harvestmen - The Biology of Opiliones. Harvard University Press 

Harvestman families